The NBL All-Star Game was a special event basketball game that has run in the past as part of the Australian National Basketball League. When held, the All-Star game has been between two teams composed of star players from that season.

The first NBL All-Star Game was held in 1982 at the Apollo Stadium in Adelaide with the East defeating the West 153–148 with Leroy Loggins taking the first of two All-Star MVP awards. It was next held in 1988 at The Glass House in Melbourne and was then held every season until 1997. After a seven-year hiatus, the NBL revived the All-Star game for the 2003–04 NBL season and it was held every season until 2007–08. For the 2012–13 season, the NBL brought back the All-Star game, having it played on 22 December 2012 at the Adelaide Arena.

The 1992, 1993 and 1994 All-Star games featured the Australian Boomers team playing against the USA Stars (1992) and the NBL Stars in 1993 and 1994. The 1992 game played at the AIS Arena in Canberra was played on 4 July and was promoted as the "Independence Day Challenge".

All-Star games by season

Wins by team (1982-2012)

Players with most appearances

Slam-Dunk champions

3-Point Shootout

See also
National Basketball League (Australia)

References

External links
Official NBL website

 
Basketball all-star games
Annual sporting events in Australia
National Basketball League (Australia)
1982 establishments in Australia
Recurring sporting events established in 1982